Verkhnerechensky is a rural locality (a khutor) and the administrative center of Verkhnerechenskoye Rural Settlement, Nekhayevsky District, Volgograd Oblast, Russia. The population was 655 as of 2010. There are 15 streets.

Geography 
Verkhnerechensky is located on the bank of the Tishanka River, 15 km northwest of Nekhayevskaya (the district's administrative centre) by road. Nizhnerechensky is the nearest rural locality.

References 

Rural localities in Nekhayevsky District